Layton Rahmatullah Benevolent Trust or LRBT is Pakistan's largest non-governmental organisation, working to fight blindness in the country. It is assumed to be not only the largest eye provider in the country but also the largest eye care provider in the world to have treated over 48 million patients in 35 years also crossing daily OPD of over 10,500 (avg daily) patients every single day. Established in 1984, it is based in Karachi with hospitals and primary eye care centres throughout the country.

Naming
The Trust is named for its two founders: Graham Layton and Zaka Rahmatulla, both whom contributed Rs. 500,000/- each to start it.

History

The trust was founded in 1985 with Rs. 500,000 apiece by Graham Layton, an Englishman who become a Pakistani citizen, and Zaka Rahmatulla. Upon his death, Layton left his estate for the benefit of LRBT.

Major sponsors
 Graham Layton Trust 
 Sight Savers International (UK) 
 Pakistan Baitul Mall
 Pakistan Central Zakat Administration 
 Infaq Foundation (Pakistan)
 Muhammad Usman Peracha (Wonder Group of Industries)

Services provided
The following services are provided at their hospitals: 
 Cataract surgery
 Cornea and External Eye Disease
 Diabetic retinopathy
 Diagnostic procedures including Fundus Flourescien Angiography, Optical Coherence Tomography, Field Analysis etc.
 Glaucoma
 Lacrimal (Tear Duct) Disorder
 Laser treatment
 Oculo-plastic Services
 Orbital Disorder
 Pediatric eye care
 Retinal disorders including Vitreo- Retinal Surgery
 Uveitis Clinic

Network
As of 2020, there are 19 fully-equipped hospitals and 58 primary eyecare centers across Pakistan making 77 facilities nationwide. Any Pakistani is just 200 km away from LRBT facility wherever they are in Pakistan.

Hospitals
 Korangi, Karachi, Sindh (Base Eye Hospital)
 Akora Khattak, Nowshera District, Khyber Pakhtunkhwa** Google Map Link Layton Rahmatulla Benevolent Trust Free Eye Hospital
 Arifwala, Pakpattan District, Punjab
 Odigram, Swat District, KPK Google map link 
 Gambat, Khairpur District, Sindh
 Khanewal, District Khanewal, Punjab
 Lahore Township, Punjab
 Lar, Multan District, Punjab
 Mandra, Rawalpindi District, Punjab
 Chiniot, Chiniot District, Punjab
 Mansehra, Mansehra District, KPK
 Quetta, Quetta District, Balochistan
 Pasrur, Sialkot District, Punjab
 Rashidabad, Tando Allahyar District, Sindh
 Shahpur, Sargodha District, Punjab
 Kalakalay, Sawat District, KPK (Hospital)
 Lahore Multan Road, Punjab
 North Karachi, Karachi, Sindh
 Tando Bago, Badin District, Sindh

References

External links
 Official website
 Graham Layton Trust

1984 establishments in Pakistan
Charities based in Pakistan
Medical and health organisations based in Pakistan
Non-profit organisations based in Pakistan
Organisations based in Karachi